Myakishevo is a rural locality (a village) in Terebayevskoye Rural Settlement, Nikolsky District, Vologda Oblast, Russia. The population was 86 as of 2002.

Geography 
Myakishevo is located 21 km north of Nikolsk (the district's administrative centre) by road. Kipshenga is the nearest rural locality.

References 

Rural localities in Nikolsky District, Vologda Oblast